Majia Township is a mountain indigenous township in Pingtung County, Taiwan. The area is known as Makazayazaya (瑪家雑牙雑牙社) in the Paiwan language, and the Taiwanese mountain pitviper (Ovophis monticola makazayazaya) is named after it. The main population is the indigenous Paiwan people.

History

Geography

Administrative divisions
The township comprises six villages: Beiye, Jiayi, Liangshan, Majia, Paiwan and Sanhe.

Tourist attractions
 Taiwan Indigenous Peoples Cultural Park

References

Townships in Pingtung County
Taiwan placenames originating from Formosan languages